Snežana Bogosavljević Bošković (born 24 January 1964) is a politician and academic in Serbia. Previously the minister of agriculture and environment in the first cabinet of Aleksandar Vučić, she is currently a legislator in the National Assembly of Serbia. Bogosavljević Bošković is a member of the Socialist Party of Serbia.

Early life and career
Bogosavljević Bošković was born in Ivanjica, then part of the Socialist Republic of Serbia in the Socialist Federal Republic of Yugoslavia. She graduated from the University of Kragujevac Faculty of Agronomy in Čačak in 1986, received a master's degree from the Faculty of Agriculture at the University of Belgrade in Zemun in 1990, and also received a Ph.D. from the latter institution in 1994. She has served as head of the Department of Animal Science and Technology at the Faculty of Agronomy in Čačak and has authored or co-authored more than two hundred scientific papers.

She has been a member of the Socialist Party of Serbia since the party's formation in 1990.

Political career

Member of the National Assembly (2012–14)
Bogosavljević Bošković first became a member of the National Assembly shortly after the 2012 Serbian parliamentary election, in which she  received the forty-fifth position on a coalition electoral list led by the Socialist Party. The coalition list won forty-four seats, and she narrowly missed winning direct election to the assembly; some Socialist representatives later resigned to become cabinet ministers in a new coalition government, however, and she was able to take her seat as a replacement very early in the new parliament's mandate. She was promoted to the eighteenth position on the Socialist-led electoral list for the 2014 election and was returned to parliament without difficulty.

Cabinet minister (2014–16)
Bogosavljević Bošković was appointed as Serbia's minister of agriculture and environment in Vučić's government on April 27, 2014. Her appointment occurred just before the 2014 Southeast Europe floods. In the aftermath of this disaster, she indicated that the cost of registered damages to the country's flood defence facilities was in excess of two billion Serbian dollars, while the damage to the agricultural sector was estimated at 228 million euros with 154 million being needed for immediate recovery.

When the  European Union (EU) and the United States of America imposed sanctions on Russia in 2014 over its annexation of Crimea, Bogosavljević Bošković remarked that Serbia had a unique opportunity to increase its agricultural and food exports to the Russian market. The Russian media quoted her as saying, "The Russian side is interested in all our agricultural and food products, particularly meat, milk, fruit and vegetables. We can export as much cheese as we can produce." She also indicated that Serbia was interested in participating in joint agricultural projects with Russian investors and that Danube River transport could be used to cut down on shipment time to Russia. Shortly after this, she was quoted as saying, “The embargo on trade between Russia, [the European Union] and US does not oblige or affect us. We want to export our products, that is, to create conditions for our producers to export their products to the interested markets.

Bogosavljević Bošković brought Serbia into a partnership with Germany on bioenergy projects in September 2014. Later in the year, during a meeting with a delegation of the International Monetary Fund, she said that increased competitiveness in the agriculture sector and the food industry would be necessary for Serbia to integrate with Europe. In early 2015, she signed a deal permitting the Italian firm Rigoni di Asiago to invest between twenty and thirty million euros in Serbia for the organic production of hazelnuts.

Serbia was required to accept increased milk imports from the European Union at low prices in 2015; Vučić and Bogosavljević Bošković subsequently indicated that surcharges on imports would be required, while Bogosavljević Bošković spoke of further discussions with the EU on protection measures to preserve Serbia's dairy sector.

In June 2015, Serbia approved a plan to reduce greenhouse gas emissions 9.8 per cent by 2030; Bogosavljević Bošković said that Serbia was the first country in the region to pledge voluntary cuts.

Return to the assembly (2016–present)
Bogosavljević Bošković received the eighth position on the Socialist Party's list in the 2016 parliamentary election and returned to the assembly when the list won twenty-nine seats. Although the Socialist Party remained in Vučić's coalition government, she was not reappointed to cabinet. She is a member of the parliamentary environmental protection committee and the committee on culture and information; a member of Serbia's delegation to the Inter-Parliamentary Union Assembly; and a member of the parliamentary friendship groups for Belarus, Cyprus, the Czech Republic, Denmark, Hungary, Kazakhstan, Norway, Poland, and Russia.

References

External links

1964 births
Living people
Women government ministers of Serbia
Members of the National Assembly (Serbia)
University of Belgrade Faculty of Agriculture alumni
University of Kragujevac alumni
People from Ivanjica
Socialist Party of Serbia politicians
Delegates to the Inter-Parliamentary Union Assembly
Women members of the National Assembly (Serbia)